Svilen is a male given name almost exclusively used in Bulgaria.

Origin

The name Svilen, was taken from the Bulgarian word svila (Cyrillic: Свила) or silk. As a result, the name refers to silken, it maybe used in many senses as an adjective other than a name.

The word itself svila originated from Serbo-Croatian. The word is mentioned in the epic Serbian poem, The Maiden of Kossovo; the line reads Svilen kalpak. This may be translated as Silken Cap.

Notable people with the name
 Svilen Neykov (born 1964), Bulgarian rower
 Svilen Noev (born 1975), Bulgarian singer-songwriter, bandleader of Ostava
 Svilen Piralkov (born 1975), Spanish water polo player
 Svilen Rusinov (born 1964), Bulgarian boxer
 Svilen Simeonov (born 1974), Bulgarian footballer
 Svilen Andreev (born 1988), Bulgarian photographer and graphic designer
 Svilen Kostadinov (born 1989), Bulgarian inventor and designer

See also
Svilengrad, Bulgarian town

Slavic masculine given names
Bulgarian masculine given names